Donald Henry Heffner (February 8, 1911 – August 1, 1989) was an American second baseman, coach and manager in Major League Baseball.

Player and coach

Heffner entered professional baseball in 1929. After all or parts of four seasons with the then-minor league Baltimore Orioles, Heffner joined the New York Yankees for the 1934 season. He spent four seasons with the Yanks as a part-time player before a trade to the St. Louis Browns afforded him an opportunity to play regularly. He appeared in more than 100 games from 1938–41 with St. Louis, including regular stints at second base (1938; 1940–41) and shortstop (1939), before reverting to a reserve role. He finished his playing career with the Philadelphia Athletics and Detroit Tigers in 1943–44. In 743 games over all or parts of 11 American League seasons (1934–44), Heffner batted .241 with six home runs and 610 hits.

In 1947, he began his managing career in the Browns’ farm system, and he promptly won consecutive pennants in his first two seasons. He returned to the Major Leagues as a coach with the Athletics, now based in Kansas City, in 1958–60 and the Tigers in 1961. Heffner then spent two successful seasons managing the San Diego Padres of the Pacific Coast League, winning the 1962 league championship, before becoming third-base coach of the New York Mets in 1964–65.

Brief term as Reds' skipper
In October 1965, he succeeded Dick Sisler as manager of the Cincinnati Reds. Heffner was hired by longtime associate Bill DeWitt, the Reds’ owner and general manager who was the front office boss of the Browns during Heffner's playing days.

The Reds were a first division finisher in 1965 and hopes were high for a pennant run the following year—especially after DeWitt added front-line starting pitcher Milt Pappas in a blockbuster trade with Baltimore involving former National League most valuable player Frank Robinson. But while the Orioles roared to the AL pennant and world championship in 1966, the Reds never got on track under their new skipper. Heffner tried to convert all-star second baseman Pete Rose into a third baseman, only to draw the popular star's wrath. (Oddly, Rose would later willingly become a third baseman for Sparky Anderson).  The Reds struggled to reach the .500 mark during the season's first three months, and finally peaked at 36–35 on June 28.  Cincinnati then proceeded to lose 11 games in a row. They broke their losing streak in the last game before the All-Star break on July 10.

But it was too late to save Heffner's job. With Cincinnati in eighth place in the National League with a record of 37–46 (.446) on July 13, Heffner was released in favor of Dave Bristol, who was serving as his third-base coach.

Heffner never again managed in the Major Leagues, although he spent 1967–68 as a California Angels coach and 1969 as manager of the Denver Bears of the American Association. He died at age 78 in Pasadena, California. He was interred at Mountain View Cemetery and Mausoleum in Altadena.

References

Baseball-library.com
John Duxbury, ed., The Baseball Register, 1968 edition. St. Louis: The Sporting News.

1911 births
1989 deaths
Augusta Tygers players
Baltimore Orioles (IL) managers
Baseball players from Pennsylvania
Baltimore Orioles (IL) players
California Angels coaches
Cincinnati Reds managers
Detroit Tigers coaches
Detroit Tigers players
Goldsboro Goldbugs players
Kansas City Athletics coaches
Major League Baseball first base coaches
Major League Baseball infielders
Major League Baseball third base coaches
Newark Bears (IL) players
New Haven Profs players
New York Mets coaches
New York Yankees players
Philadelphia Athletics players
Portland Mariners players
St. Louis Browns players
Salisbury-Spencer Colonials players
San Antonio Missions managers